"Better Off Without You" is a song by English singer and songwriter Becky Hill, featuring English DJ and producer Shift K3Y. It was released on 10 January 2020 as the lead single from her debut studio album, Only Honest on the Weekend. The song peaked at number 14 on the UK Singles Chart.

Background
When talking about the song, Becky Hill said, "'Better Off Without You' is that perfect break up song. Starting the year with those New Year, new me feels, it's your new self love anthem of 2020! Written about a break up of my own, Better Off Without You was a song that I listened to over the course of 2019 that helped me through some really dark times. I can't wait to share this bit of personal therapy with others and watch the song take on a life of its own."

Music video
A music video to accompany the release of "Better Off Without You" was first released onto YouTube on 10 January 2020.

Personnel
Credits adapted from Tidal.
 Jarly – producer, associated performer, bass, drums, guitar, keyboards, piano, programming, sound effects, strings
 Lewis Shay Jankel – producer, composer, lyricist, associated performer, engineer, featured artist, music production, studio personnel
 Svidden – producer, associated performer, bass, drums, guitar, keyboards, piano, programming, sound effects, strings
 Rebecca Claire Hill – composer, lyricist, associated performer, vocals
 Stuart Hawkes – mastering engineer, studio personnel
 Wez Clarke – mixer, studio personnel

Charts

Weekly charts

Year-end charts

Certifications

Release history

References

2020 songs
2020 singles
Becky Hill songs
Shift K3Y songs
Songs written by Becky Hill
Songs written by Shift K3Y
Polydor Records singles